The lesser tree mouse (Chiruromys vates) is a species of rodent in the family Muridae found only in Papua New Guinea.

References

Chiruromys
Rodents of Papua New Guinea
Mammals described in 1908
Taxonomy articles created by Polbot
Taxa named by Oldfield Thomas